Esteban Orlando Harrington (1873–1936) was a Chilean architect. He was born in 1873 in Valparaiso and died in Chile in 1936. He was the son of an American, William Harrington and a Chilean, Protasia Arellano.

Career
Esteban Harrington was a prolific architect. He did considerable work in the Buenos Aires city. Most of the quantum was produced Harrington and his works have contributed much to giving character to the port and to the value of its architecture.

With offices in Valparaiso and Santiago with his brother Richard, the business greatly benefited from the critical situation created by the earthquake in Valparaiso in 1906.

His work is characterized by the adaptation of the style of Victorian architecture to the topography of Valparaiso, as part of a formal language similar to the Colonial Victorian construction styles used in San Francisco, Auckland, Sydney and Wellington.

Many of the buildings and houses that he designed are still adorning Valparaiso, full of class, charm, elegance and structural quality.

After being hit by a tram, Esteban Harrington died in 1936.

Works
South American Steam Boats Company Building, at 895 Blanco Street.
Residential complex in Pasaje Harrington, on Playa Ancha, between 1908 and 1910.

References

1873 births
1936 deaths
Chilean architects